The 2015 Enterprise Cup was the 77th time that the Enterprise Cup has been contested.

Fixtures and results

References

2015
2015 in African rugby union
2015 rugby union tournaments for clubs
2015 in Kenyan sport